Pumpuri is a residential area and neighbourhood of the city Jūrmala, Latvia.

The Pumpuri railway station was established in 1877.

References

External links 

Neighbourhoods in Jūrmala